The Association of College and Research Libraries (ACRL), a division of the American Library Association, is a professional association of academic librarians and other interested individuals. It is dedicated to enhancing the ability of academic library and information professionals to serve the information needs of the higher education community and to improving learning, teaching, and research. The association serves librarians in all types of academic libraries at the community college, college, and university level and also serves librarians that work in comprehensive and specialized research libraries.

The Association of College and Research Libraries is the largest division of the American Library Association. It has a membership of approximately 9,000 and provides a broad range of professional services and programs for a diverse membership.

The Association publishes an open access journal, College & Research Libraries and the review magazine Choice.

History 
The Association of College and Research Libraries has its roots as the College Library section of the American Library Association, which first met in 1890, attended by 15 librarians representing major colleges located on the east coast of the United States. In 1897 the section was renamed the College and Reference Library Section in recognition of the participation of reference librarians. In 1923, the section established bylaws and began charging dues. In 1938, the section adopted new bylaws which moved the section to the Association of College and Reference Libraries and allowed for more autonomy and for the creation of subsections for college and junior college libraries, teachers college libraries, university libraries, and others. In 1940, Association of College and Research Libraries became the American Library Association's first division. In 1956, when the Library Reference Services Division was established as a separate division of the American Library Association, the Association of College and Research Libraries changed the "Reference" to "Research" in its name and became the Association of College and Research Libraries.  In 1978, they held their first standalone conference. On January 11, 2016, the ACRL adopted the Framework for Information Literacy for Higher Education. On September 7, 2021, Robert (Jay) Malone became the executive director of the ACRL.

Sections 
The Association of College and Research Libraries supports seventeen sections:
 African American Studies Librarians Section
 Anthropology and Sociology Section
 Arts Section
 Asian, African, and Middle Eastern Section
 College Libraries Section
 Community and Junior College Libraries Section
 Distance Learning Section
 Education and Behavioral Sciences Section
 Instruction Section
 Law and Political Science Section
 Literatures in English Section
 Rare Books and Manuscripts Section
 Science and Technology Section
 Slavic and East European Section
 University Libraries Section
 Western European Studies Section
 Women and Gender Studies Section

Awards 
The Association of College and Research Libraries issues awards annually to honor academic and research librarians for significant achievements. These awards include a citation, and in some cases also a cash award.
 Academic/Research Librarian of the Year
 Excellence in Academic Libraries Awards
 Hugh C. Atkinson Memorial Award
 CLS Innovation in College Librarianship Award
 CJCLS EBSCO Community College Learning Resources Program Award
 CJCLS EBSCO Community College Library Achievement Award
 Routledge Distance Learning Librarianship Conference Sponsorship Award
 EBSS Distinguished Education and Behavioral Sciences Librarian Award
 Miriam Dudley Instruction Librarian Award
 Instruction Section Innovation Award
 LPSS Marta Lange/SAGE-CQ Press Award
 STS Innovation in Science and Technology Librarianship Award
 WGSS Career Achievement in Women & Gender Studies Librarianship Award
 WGSS Significant Achievement in Women & Gender Studies Librarianship Award

Chapters 
The Association of College and Research Libraries supports local chapters. The chapters provide programming and professional development opportunities for academic libraries in their region. The ACRL Chapters Council facilitates communication between the chapters and ACRL national.
ACRL Chapters:
 Alabama Association of College & Research Libraries
 Arizona State Library Association, Division of College and University Libraries
 Arkansas Library Association, College and University Division
 California Academic and Research Libraries (CARL)
 Colorado Academic Library Association
 Delaware Valley Chapter of the ACRL(Delaware & Eastern Pennsylvania)
 Florida Association of College and Research Libraries
 Academic Library Division (ALD) of the Georgia Library Association (GLA)
 Idaho Library Association Chapter of the ACRL
 Illinois Association of College and Research Libraries (IACRL)
 Indiana Academic Library Association of the Indiana Library Federation; Indiana Chapter of the ACRL
 Iowa Library Association Chapter of the ACRL
 The College and University Libraries Section of the Kansas Library Association
 Kentucky Association of College and Research Libraries
 Association of College and Research Libraries Louisiana Chapter
 Maryland Library Association, Academic & Research Library Division
 Michigan Academic Library Association (MiALA)
 Academic and Research Library Division of the Minnesota Library Association
 Missouri Association of College and Research Libraries, Library Association
 Montana Chapter of the Association of College and Research Libraries
 Nebraska Library Association, College and University Section
 Nevada Association of College and Research Libraries
 ACRL New England Chapter (CT, MA, ME, NH, RI, and VT)
 New Jersey Library Association, College and University Section
 ACRL New Mexico Chapter
 Eastern New York Chapter of ACRL
 ACRL Chapter of the Greater New York Metro Area
 ACRL - North Carolina Library Association (ACRL-NC Chapter)
 North Dakota/Manitoba Chapter
 Academic Library Association of Ohio (ALAO)
 Oklahoma Chapter of the Association of College and Research Libraries (OK/ACRL)
 ACRL Oregon Chapter
 Western Pennsylvania/West Virginia Association of Research and College Libraries Chapter
 South Carolina Library Association - College and University Section
 Academic/Health/Special Libraries Section of the South Dakota Library Association
 Tennessee Library Association, College and University Roundtable
 College and University Library Division of the Texas Library Association
 Utah Library Association - Association of College and Research Libraries Roundtable
 College and University Section of the Virginia Library Association
 Washington State Chapter of the Association of College and Research Libraries
 Wisconsin Library Association, Wisconsin Association of Academic Librarians

See also
Association of Research Libraries

References

External links
History of the ACRL
ACRL Sections

American Library Association
Library-related professional associations